Kati Luoto is a Finnish strength athlete who is foremost known as the winner of the United Strongmen Women's World Championships held in 2013 and seven times Finland's Strongest Woman.

Career
Luoto had been involved in various sports from an early age and after giving birth to her three children, she started to attend the gym to shape her body and began to train seriously in 1999. In 2003 and trained by the former strongman Harri Simonen, she participated in her first Finland's Strongest Woman contest where she was placed 2nd. As a strongwoman performer, she is particularly known for her log lift performance (110 kg in training).

Competition record
2013 United Strongmen Women's World Championships - 1st
2013 Finland's Strongest Woman - 1st
2013 Scandinavia's Strongest Woman -1st
2012 Global Powerlifting Alliance European Championship Raw Bench Press - 1st
2011 Finland's Strongest Woman - 1st
2011 Real Power Games Strong Woman - 1st
2010 Finland's Strongest Woman - 1st
2010 Global Powerlifting Alliance European Championship Raw Bench Press - 1st
2009 Finland's Strongest Woman - 2nd
2009 Real Power Games Strong Woman - 1st
2008 World's Strongest Woman - 3rd
2007 Europe's Strongest Woman - 4th
2007 Finland's Strongest Woman - 1st
2006 World's Strongest Woman - 4th
2006 Finland's Strongest Woman - 1st
2005 World's Strongest Woman - 7th
2005 Europe's Strongest Woman - 5th
2005 Finland's Strongest Woman - 1st
2004 Finland's Strongest Woman - 1st
2003 Finland's Strongest Woman - 2nd

References

Finnish strength athletes
Female powerlifters
Strongwomen
Sportspeople from Helsinki
1972 births
Living people
Finnish powerlifters